The 2019 Úrvalsdeild karla, also known as Pepsi Max-deild karla for sponsorship reasons, was the 108th season of top-flight Icelandic football. Twelve teams contested the league, including the defending champions Valur, who won their 21st league title in 2018.

The season began in April 2019 and concluded on 28 September 2019.

Teams

The 2019 Úrvalsdeild is contested by twelve teams, ten of which played in the division the previous year and two teams promoted from 1. deild karla. The bottom two teams from the previous season, Fjölnir and Keflavík, were relegated to the 2019 1. deild karla and were replaced by ÍA and HK, champions and runners-up of the 2018 1. deild karla respectively.

Club information

Personnel and kits

Managerial changes

League table

Results
Each team played home and away once against every other team for a total of 22 games each.

Positions by round

Top goalscorers

References

External links
  

Úrvalsdeild karla (football) seasons
1
Iceland
Iceland